Aoshima is a Japanese name meaning "blue island". It is most commonly written as 青島, but may also be written 青嶋, 蒼島, and  青嶌.

Aoshima may refer to:

Companies
Aoshima Bunka Kyozai, a well-known Japanese model car, model aircraft and model ship manufacturer

Places
Aoshima, Miyazaki, an island in Miyazaki Prefecture, Japan
Aoshima, Ehime, a tiny island offshore of Ehime Prefecture, Japan, also known as Cat Island

People
Aoshima (surname)

See also
Qingdao, also written 青島